The 2005–06 season in the second division of Iranian football ended with promotion to the Azadegan League for Pegah Tehran, Nassaji Mazandaran, Etka Gorgan and Shahrdari Tabriz.

Standings

Group A

Group B

Second place playoff 
May 14, 2006 in Arak

Nassaji Mazandaran Promoted to Azadegan League.

Relegation playoff

Group A 
May 14, 2006 in Isfahan

Shahrdari Kerman Relegated to 3rd Division.

Group B 

Maziran Sari Relegated to 3rd Division.

References

League 2 (Iran) seasons
3